Herbert James Elliott  (born 25 February 1938) is a former Australian athlete and arguably the world's greatest middle distance runner of his era. In August 1958 he set the world record in the mile run, clocking 3:54.5, 2.7 seconds under the record held by Derek Ibbotson; later in the month he set the 1500 metres world record, running 3.36.0, 2.1 seconds under the record held by Stanislav Jungwirth. In the 1500 metres at the 1960 Rome Olympics, he won the gold medal and bettered his own world record with a time of 3:35.6.

Herb Elliot never lost a mile run and accomplished 36 wins over this distance. During his career, he broke four minutes for the mile on 17 occasions.

Elliott retired from athletics soon after the 1960 Olympics, at the age of 22. He made a career in business, and at one time was chairman of Fortescue Metals Group. He was also chairman of Global Corporate Challenge health initiative.

Biography
Elliott was born on 25 February 1938 at Kensington Hospital, Perth, Western Australia, to Herb and Eileen Elliott, née Carmody. He attended Christian Brothers College, Perth. The intense sporting culture at Christian Brothers provided an ideal grounding for Elliott to reach the highest levels of athletic achievement. Elliott also attended the University of Cambridge.

On 6 August 1958, Elliott set a new world record for the mile (3:54.5) at Morton Stadium in Dublin. Later that month he broke the 1500 metres world record in Gothenburg with a time of 3:36.0. His closest Australian rival at the time was Merv Lincoln.

Commonwealth and Olympic Games
At the 1958 Commonwealth Games in Cardiff, Wales, he won gold in the 880 yards and the mile. Two years later, at the 1960 Summer Olympics in Rome, Elliott won the 1500 m gold medal in world record time (3:35.6), finishing 2.6 seconds ahead of second placed Michel Jazy of France.

Elliott credited his visionary and iconoclastic coach, Percy Cerutty, with inspiration to train harder and more naturally than anyone of his era. Cerutty was known to avoid the track, talk about role models outside athletics (such as Leonardo da Vinci and Jesus), and bring his athletes to the unspoiled seaside beauty of Portsea training camp south of Melbourne, where Elliott would sprint up sand dunes until he dropped. "Faster", Cerutty would say, "it's only pain."

University education
After winning in Rome in 1960, he started a degree course at the University of Cambridge, England. He retired from athletics after running the half-mile in the 1962 University v AAA match.

Business
Elliott served as the CEO of Puma North America and between 2001 and 2006 as a board member at Ansell. From May 2005, he served as deputy chairman of Fortescue Metals Group, the world's fifth largest iron ore miner by capacity, and was the non-executive chairman of the firm from March 2007. On 18 August 2011, Elliott was expected to move from chairman to deputy chairman, handing over the role of chairman to Andrew Forrest.

Sydney Olympics
Elliott was one of the Olympic Torch bearers at the opening ceremony of the 2000 Summer Olympics in Sydney, and entered the stadium for the final segment before the lighting of the Olympic Flame.

Family

On 2 May 1959, Elliott married Anne Dudley, a hairdresser from Perth. They have six children.

Honours
Elliott carried the torch of peace to the MCG when Pope John Paul II visited Melbourne in 1986.

In the Queen's Birthday Honours List of 1964, he was appointed a Member of the Order of the British Empire (MBE). In the Queen's Birthday Honours List of 2002, he was appointed a Companion of the Order of Australia (AC), to wit:For service to community leadership through the development of sport in Australia, continuing involvement in the Olympic movement at national and international levels, and as a supporter and benefactor of community and charitable organisations for youth, health promotion and cultural understanding.

He is an Australian Living Treasure.

He was inducted into the Sport Australia Hall of Fame in 1985.

Fortescue Metals Group named a new port at Point Anderson (near Port Hedland, Western Australia) Herb Elliott Port .

Further reading
  Foreword by Percy Cerutty
 Reissue

Notes and references

1938 births
Living people
Australian male middle-distance runners
Olympic athletes of Australia
Athletes (track and field) at the 1960 Summer Olympics
Australian businesspeople
Athletes from Perth, Western Australia
Western Australian Sports Star of the Year winners
Sport Australia Hall of Fame inductees
People educated at Aquinas College, Perth
Olympic gold medalists for Australia
Athletes (track and field) at the 1958 British Empire and Commonwealth Games
Commonwealth Games gold medallists for Australia
Companions of the Order of Australia
Australian Members of the Order of the British Empire
Fortescue Metals Group
Commonwealth Games medallists in athletics
Track and field athletes from Western Australia
Medalists at the 1960 Summer Olympics
Olympic gold medalists in athletics (track and field)
BBC Sports Personality World Sport Star of the Year winners
Medallists at the 1958 British Empire and Commonwealth Games